This is a list of main battle tanks, and other vehicles serving that role, in active military service with countries of the world. A main battle tank (MBT) is the type of powerful, heavily armoured and highly mobile tank which is the backbone of a mechanized land force.

Table of main battle tanks by country

A

B

C

D

E

F

G

H

I

J

K

L

M

N

O

P

Q

R

S

T

U

V

Y

Z

See also
 Armoured fighting vehicle classification
List of armoured fighting vehicles of Ukraine
 List of main battle tanks by generation

References

Notes
 Hunnicutt, R. P. Patton: A History of the American Main Battle Tank. 1984. Presidio Press; .

tanks
Main battle tanks by country